Andrew Adams may refer to:

Andrew Adams (American football) (born 1992), American football safety
Andrew Adams (politician) (1736–1797), American lawyer, jurist, and political leader
Andrew Leith Adams (1827–1883), Scottish physician, naturalist and geologist
Andy Adams (writer) (1859–1935), American writer of western fiction
Andy Adams (pseudonym), a Grosset & Dunlap pseudonym for several writers of a series of novels featuring Biff Brewster
Andrew Adams, character in Fear the Walking Dead

See also
Adams (surname)